The 1948–49 SK Rapid Wien season was the 51st season in club history.

Squad

Squad and statistics

Squad statistics

Fixtures and results

League

Cup

References

1948-49 Rapid Wien Season
Rapid